Arthur Lomax (born 17 May 2004) is an English professional footballer who plays as a midfielder for  club Tranmere Rovers.

Career

Wigan Athletic
Lomax joined Wigan Athletic from Tranmere Rovers at under-14 level. He scored four goals in the U15 Premier League Floodlit Cup final against Sunderland at the DW Stadium in April 2019. He helped the under-18 team to win the Professional Development League North title and become National champions. However he left the club in April 2022 following the expiry of his two-year scholarship.

Tranmere Rovers
On 30 May 2022, Lomax returned to Tranmere Rovers to sign his first professional contract. He made his first-team debut on 20 September, after coming on as a half-time substitute for Kieron Morris in a 2–2 draw with Bolton Wanderers in an EFL Trophy match at Prenton Park. He earned his first start in the competition on 18 October, in a 1–0 victory at Crewe Alexandra.

Career statistics

References

2004 births
Living people
English footballers
Association football midfielders
Wigan Athletic F.C. players
Tranmere Rovers F.C. players
English Football League players